Jingang Town is a rural town in Liuyang City, Hunan Province, People's Republic of China. The town is bordered to the north and west by Dayao Town, to the east by Jinshan Town of Shangli County, to the south by Litian Town of Liling, and to the northeast by Chengtanjiang Town.

Administrative division
The town is divided into seven villages and three communities, the following areas: 
 Jinshi Community
 Jinsheng Community
 Limei Community
 Shanhu Village
 Shaluo Village
 Dangui Village
 Shiguang Village
 Taizihu Village
 Xingxing Village
 Nanyue Village

Geography
The Nanchuan River flows north to south through the town.

There are two reservoirs in the town: Taizihu Reservoir and Duzhuang Reservoir.

Economy
Jingang Town's economy is based on fireworks and agricultural resources.

Education
 Jingang Middle School

Transportation

National Highway
The National Highway 106 runs north to south through the town.

Expressway
The Changsha–Liuyang Expressway, from Changsha, running northwest to southeast through the town to Jiangxi.

County road
County Road X008 passes across the town east to west.

Religion
Shishuang Temple is a Buddhist temple in the town.

Nanyue Shengdi Temple is a Taoist temple in the town.

Attractions
The main attractions are the Grand House of Liu Family and the Grand House of Li Family.

Yunyan Cave is a famous scenic spot.

References

Divisions of Liuyang
Liuyang